White Bluff is a town in Dickson County, Tennessee, United States. The population was 3,862 at the 2020 census and 3,206 at the 2010 census. The community name derives from the White Bluff Iron Forge.

History
A fort was constructed at White Bluff in 1806, and an iron forge shortly afterward. The current town, which grew out of a Civil War-era Union Army encampment, was platted in 1867, and within a few years had grown to include several mercantile businesses and a planing mill.

Geography
White Bluff is located in eastern Dickson County at  (36.107971, -87.220300).

White Bluff is located on U.S. Route 70 at its junction with State Route 47. US 70 leads east  to Nashville and west  to Dickson. TN 47 leads southwest  to Burns before continuing to Dickson, and northwest  to Charlotte, the Dickson County seat.

White Bluff is east of Montgomery Bell State Park.

Demographics

2020 census

As of the 2020 United States census, there were 3,862 people, 1,306 households, and 832 families residing in the town.

2000 census
At the 2000 census, there were 2,142 people, 881 households and 604 families residing in the town. The population density was 536.9 per square mile (207.3/km2). There were 947 housing units at an average density of 237.4 per square mile (91.6/km2). The racial makeup of the town was 98.13% White, 0.65% African American, 0.37% Native American, 0.19% Asian, 0.09% from other races, and 0.56% from two or more races. Hispanic or Latino of any race were 0.65% of the population.

There were 881 households, of which 30.9% had children under the age of 18 living with them, 53.1% were married couples living together, 11.4% had a female householder with no husband present, and 31.4% were non-families. 27.7% of all households were made up of individuals, and 11.0% had someone living alone who was 65 years of age or older. The average household size was 2.43 and the average family size was 2.96.

24.4% of the population were under the age of 18, 8.2% from 18 to 24, 30.7% from 25 to 44, 24.3% from 45 to 64, and 12.4% who were 65 years of age or older. The median age was 36 years. For every 100 females, there were 100.9 males. For every 100 females age 18 and over, there were 93.0 males.

The median household income was $34,107 and the median family income was $39,219. Males had a median income of $31,509 versus $25,260 for females. The per capita income for the town was $16,229. About 6.1% of families and 8.1% of the population were below the poverty line, including 3.9% of those under age 18 and 13.6% of those age 65 or over.

Education 

There have been several public and private schools in the area. The first public school was destroyed by fire in 1879. White Bluff now has White Bluff Elementary School and Williams James School. The original William James was built in 1923 on land donated by Colonel William James, a Spanish–American War officer from whom it gets its team sports name, the Colonels, and who is entombed within the current building. (The 1923 building was demolished after the 1971–1972 school year.) It was a high school (for many years all twelve grades were on the site) until 1972 when it became a junior high school (grades 7–9). In the 1999–2000 school year, the school was changed to a middle school (grades 6–8) as part of a district-wide realignment, hence its current name, William James Middle School.

Area attractions
 Interstate Packaging Arboretum
 Montgomery Bell State Park

Notable people
 Anson A. Mount IV, star of film and television. Anson's father, Anson Mount III, also grew up in White Bluff, and became the sports editor for Playboy magazine.
 Larry Fleet, singer-songwriter

Radio
  WYCZ 1030 AM

References

External links
 Town of White Bluff official website
 Blufwatch - White Bluff information and history

Towns in Dickson County, Tennessee
Towns in Tennessee
Cities in Nashville metropolitan area